African Continental Bank Football Club or simply ACB FC was a Nigerian football team based in Lagos. It was sponsored by the African Continental Bank and was a founding member of the Nigerian Premier League in 1972. They were relegated from the top league for good in 1994 with a record of two wins, 12 ties and 16 losses.

External links
Team profile - Footballdatabase

Defunct football clubs in Nigeria
Football clubs in Lagos
Association football clubs disestablished in 1994
Sports clubs in Nigeria